Obi-Wan Kenobi is a fictional character in the Star Wars franchise. Within the original trilogy, Obi-Wan is a Jedi Master as a supporting character and is portrayed by English actor Alec Guinness. In the later-released prequel trilogy, a younger version of the character serves as one of the two main protagonists, alongside Anakin Skywalker, and is portrayed by Scottish actor Ewan McGregor. In the original trilogy he is introduced as Ben Kenobi, an alias he uses while in hiding from the Empire. He is a mentor to Luke Skywalker, to whom he introduces the ways of the Jedi. After sacrificing himself in a duel against Darth Vader, Obi-Wan guides Luke through the Force in his fight against the Galactic Empire. In the prequel trilogy, set two decades earlier, he is initially a Padawan (apprentice) to Jedi Master Qui-Gon Jinn, and later mentor and friend of Luke's father Anakin, who falls to the dark side of the Force and becomes Vader. The character briefly appears in the sequel trilogy as a disembodied voice, speaking to protagonist Rey. He is frequently featured as a main character in various other Star Wars media, including the streaming television miniseries Obi-Wan Kenobi, in which McGregor reprised the role. 

Guinness' performance as Obi-Wan in the original Star Wars (1977) earned him a nomination for the Academy Award for Best Supporting Actor, the only acting nomination for a Star Wars film. McGregor's performance as the character in the prequels received praise as well, considered to be among the highlights of the trilogy. Guinness won the Saturn Award for Best Supporting Actor for his performance in A New Hope, while McGregor was nominated for the same category 20 years later for his performance in The Phantom Menace.

Creation and development
The character is loosely inspired by General Makabe Rokurōta, a character from Akira Kurosawa's film The Hidden Fortress, played by Toshiro Mifune (whom franchise creator George Lucas had originally wanted to cast as Obi-Wan). In an early draft of the original Star Wars film, Obi-Wan's first meeting with Luke Skywalker is lifted directly from The Hobbit, acknowledging Gandalf as a source of inspiration. Lucas originally planned for Obi-Wan to live through the original film, but found that the character had nothing to do during the culminating battle sequence. Lucas later reflected that he felt that "It would be much more powerful, satisfying and interesting if Darth Vader were to kill him and he were to go on to a different form."

Appearances

Skywalker saga

Original trilogy (1977–1983)

Obi-Wan Kenobi is introduced in the original Star Wars film living as a 57-year old hermit under the name of Ben Kenobi on the planet Tatooine. When Luke Skywalker (Mark Hamill) and C-3PO (Anthony Daniels) travel the desert in search of the lost R2-D2 (Kenny Baker), Obi-Wan rescues them from a band of Tusken Raiders. At Obi-Wan's home, the now-found R2-D2 plays a recording of Princess Leia (Carrie Fisher) saying that R2-D2 contains the plans for the Galactic Empire's planet-destroying battle station, the Death Star. Leia asks him to deliver R2-D2 and the plans safely to her home planet of Alderaan in order to help the Rebel Alliance. Obi-Wan reveals to Luke his secret identity and explains that he is a Jedi, a member of an ancient group of Force-sensitive warriors. He explains that the Jedi were hunted down and exterminated by the Empire with help from his former apprentice, Darth Vader (portrayed by David Prowse, voiced by James Earl Jones), the apparent killer of Luke's father. He gives Luke his father's lightsaber and asks him to accompany him to Alderaan and take up Jedi training. Luke, at first, declines; but after finding that his aunt Beru (Shelagh Fraser) and uncle Owen (Phil Brown) have been killed by Imperial stormtroopers, he decides to go with Obi-Wan to Alderaan and train as a Jedi.

At the settlement of Mos Eisley, Obi-Wan uses the Force to trick Imperial troops into letting them through a military checkpoint. They enter a local cantina and meet smugglers Han Solo (Harrison Ford) and Chewbacca (Peter Mayhew). Obi-Wan and Luke make a deal to travel to Alderaan aboard Han's ship, the Millennium Falcon. During the mission, Obi-Wan begins instructing Luke in lightsaber combat. He suddenly feels "a great disturbance in the Force", and when the ship comes out of light speed, he and the others find that the Empire has destroyed Alderaan. The Falcon then encounters an Imperial TIE fighter. They chase the TIE fighter to the Death Star, and subsequently get caught in the battle station's tractor beam. On board the Death Star, Obi-Wan ventures through and disables the tractor beam. Moments later, Vader confronts him, and they engage in a lightsaber duel. Obi-Wan uses the duel to distract Vader as Luke, Leia, Han and Chewbacca escape to the Falcon. Obi-Wan allows Vader to strike him down, and his body mysteriously vanishes the moment he dies. At the climax of the film, during the Rebel attack on the Death Star, Obi-Wan speaks to Luke through the Force to help him destroy the battle station.

In The Empire Strikes Back, Obi-Wan Kenobi appears several times as a spirit through the Force. On the ice planet Hoth, he appears to instruct Luke to go to the planet Dagobah to find the exiled Jedi Master Yoda (Frank Oz). Despite Yoda's skepticism, Obi-Wan convinces his former teacher to continue Luke's training. Obi-Wan appears later to beseech Luke not to leave Dagobah to try to rescue his friends on Cloud City, although Luke ignores this advice.

In Return of the Jedi, Obi-Wan again appears to Luke after Yoda's death on Dagobah. Obi-Wan acknowledges that Darth Vader is indeed Luke's father, revealed by Vader himself in the previous film and confirmed by Yoda on his deathbed, and also reveals that Leia is Luke's twin sister. He urges Luke to confront and defeat Vader. After the Rebels destroy the second Death Star and defeat the Empire, Obi-Wan appears at the celebration on Endor, alongside the Force spirits of Yoda and the redeemed Anakin Skywalker (Sebastian Shaw; in later re-releases, Shaw is replaced by Hayden Christensen).

Prequel trilogy (1999–2005)
In Star Wars: Episode I – The Phantom Menace, set 32 years before A New Hope, a 25-year-old Obi-Wan Kenobi (Ewan McGregor) appears as the Padawan apprentice of Jedi Master Qui-Gon Jinn (Liam Neeson). He accompanies his master in negotiations with the corrupt Trade Federation, which is blockading the planet Naboo with a fleet of spaceships. They fight a swarm of battle droids and stow away on a landing craft en route to Naboo. Once on Naboo, Obi-Wan and Qui-Gon rescue Naboo's 14-year-old Queen Padmé Amidala (Natalie Portman), with help from native Gungan Jar Jar Binks (Ahmed Best), and escape in a spaceship toward the Republic capital of Coruscant. Their ship is damaged in the escape, causing the hyperdrive generator to malfunction, and they land on Tatooine, where they discover the nine-year-old slave Anakin Skywalker (Jake Lloyd). Qui-Gon believes the boy is the "Chosen One" prophesied to bring balance to the Force. Anakin joins the group as they travel to Coruscant. While leaving Tatooine, they are attacked by Darth Maul (portrayed by Ray Park, voiced by Peter Serafinowicz), a member of the Sith, a cult of the dark side long thought to be extinct.

When Qui-Gon and Obi-Wan return to Naboo to defeat the Trade Federation, they are met again by Maul, who engages them both in lightsaber combat. When Maul mortally wounds Qui-Gon, Obi-Wan storms in to duel the Sith lord, who nearly kills him. However, Obi-Wan manages to turn the tables and defeat Maul, cutting him in half. He promises to fulfill Qui-Gon's dying wish to train Anakin as a Jedi, with or without the council's blessing. Yoda proclaims Obi-Wan a Jedi Knight and reluctantly allows him to take Anakin on as his own Padawan.

In Attack of the Clones, set 10 years later, Obi-Wan is now a respected Jedi Knight and the master of Anakin Skywalker (Hayden Christensen). Over the years, Anakin has grown powerful but arrogant, and believes that Obi-Wan is "holding him back". After they save Padmé, now a senator, from an assassination attempt, Obi-Wan goes on a solo mission to trace the would-be assassins involved to the planet Kamino. He learns of a massive clone army that the planet's inhabitants are building for the Republic. The clones' template is bounty hunter Jango Fett (Temuera Morrison), and he and Obi-Wan battle once the latter deduces Fett must be behind the attempted assassination. Fett escapes to the planet Geonosis with his clone son Boba (Daniel Logan), unaware that Obi-Wan has pursued them.

On Geonosis, Obi-Wan discovers that a conspiracy of star systems bent on revolution from the Republic is led by Jedi-turned-Sith Lord Count Dooku (Christopher Lee), Qui-Gon's old master. After sending a message to Anakin, Obi-Wan is captured, interrogated, and sentenced to death by Dooku. Anakin and Padmé arrive with a cadre of Jedi and the clone army, just in time to prevent the executions. Obi-Wan and Anakin confront Dooku, but the Sith Lord overpowers them both. Yoda intervenes and saves their lives, at the cost of Dooku's escape.

In Revenge of the Sith, set three years later, Obi-Wan is now a Jedi Master and a member of the Jedi Council, as well as a General in the Grand Army of the Republic. Anakin, by now a Jedi Knight, remains Obi-Wan's partner, and the two have become war heroes and best friends. The film opens with the two on a rescue mission to save the kidnapped Supreme Chancellor Palpatine (Ian McDiarmid) from cyborg Separatist commander General Grievous (Matthew Wood) on board his cruiser. Dooku duels the Jedi once again, knocking Obi-Wan unconscious; while Obi-Wan is out cold, Anakin defeats Dooku and kills him in cold blood on Palpatine's orders. Soon after returning to Coruscant, Obi-Wan travels to planet Utapau to track down Grievous.

After finding the Separatist encampment, Obi-Wan fights Grievous and kills him with Grievous' own blaster. When Palpatine—who is secretly the Sith Lord Darth Sidious and the mastermind of the war—issues Order 66 to have the clone troopers turn on the Jedi, Obi-Wan survives the attempt on his life and escapes, rendezvousing with Yoda and Senator Bail Organa (Jimmy Smits) of Alderaan aboard Organa's ship, Tantive III. Returning to Coruscant, he and Yoda discover that every Jedi in the Jedi Temple has been murdered. After sending a beacon to all surviving Jedi to scatter across the galaxy and remain in hiding, a heartbroken Obi-Wan watches security footage revealing that it was Anakin—who is now Palpatine's Sith apprentice, Darth Vader—who led the chaos. Yoda says that he will confront Palpatine, and he charges Obi-Wan with battling Vader. Obi-Wan is loath to fight his best friend, but reluctantly accepts when Yoda says that Anakin Skywalker no longer exists, having been “consumed” by Vader.

Obi-Wan visits Padmé to question of Vader's whereabouts, and realizes that Vader is her husband and the father of her unborn child. When Padmé sets out to the volcanic planet Mustafar to confront her husband herself, Obi-Wan secretly stows away aboard her ship. After they arrive on Mustafar, Obi-Wan reveals himself and confronts Vader, who accuses Padmé and Obi-Wan of conspiring against him and uses the dark side to choke Padmé into unconsciousness. A long and ferocious lightsaber duel occurs between Obi-Wan and Vader, ending with Obi-Wan severing Vader's legs and left arm. Obi-Wan watches in horror as Vader slides too close to a lava flow and catches fire; he then takes his former friend's lightsaber and leaves him to die. Unbeknownst to Obi-Wan, Vader is rescued by Palpatine moments later and reconstructed into the cyborg as first seen in the original trilogy.

Obi-Wan takes Padmé to the asteroid Polis Massa, where she dies after giving birth to twins Luke and Leia. Afterwards, Obi-Wan assists in hiding Luke and Leia from the Empire. While Leia is adopted by Bail Organa and his wife, Yoda instructs Obi-Wan to deliver Luke to Anakin's stepbrother Owen Lars (Joel Edgerton) and his wife Beru (Bonnie Piesse) on Tatooine. Yoda then reveals that Qui-Gon's spirit will teach them both to become one with the Force after death. On Tatooine, Obi-Wan hands Luke off to his step-family and goes into exile to watch over the boy and wait until the time is right to challenge Palpatine and the newly-created Galactic Empire.

Sequel trilogy (2015–2019)
In The Force Awakens, set 30 years after Return of the Jedi, the protagonist Rey (Daisy Ridley) hears Obi-Wan's voice when she touches the lightsaber that previously belonged to Luke. Obi-Wan says Rey's name, before echoing the words of encouragement he gave to Luke during his training on the Millennium Falcon: "These are your first steps." James Arnold Taylor first recorded the lines for this scene, but his recordings were replaced with Ewan McGregor's voice acting. Obi-Wan's line "Rey" is an edited voice recording of Alec Guinness saying "afraid".

In The Last Jedi, Luke indirectly mentions Obi-Wan while talking with Rey about the fall of the Jedi. He is also mentioned in Leia's message to him when R2-D2 plays it in an attempt to inspire Luke to help the Resistance to the tyrannical First Order. According to the film's writer and director, Rian Johnson,
I would have loved to have had Ewan McGregor in the movie but it was just a matter of storytelling. The original relationship with Obi Wan — obviously if Alec Guinness were still with us that would have made sense. But we never saw Luke ever interact with the Ewan version of Obi Wan, so there's less of the emotional connection and it might have been a little odd. ... so it made sense that Yoda be the one that comes back and kicks [Luke's] butt a little.

In The Rise of Skywalker, Rey hears Obi-Wan's voice along with other Jedi from the past as she battles a resurrected Palpatine, revealed to be both her grandfather and the mastermind of the First Order. Obi-Wan says to her, "These are your final steps, Rey. Rise and take them... Rey... Rise." Both the voices of McGregor and Guinness are used, again with recording of Guinness saying "afraid" being repurposed to say "Rey".

Other films
Obi-Wan is referenced indirectly in the 2016 film Rogue One. Rebel Alliance leader Mon Mothma (Genevieve O'Reilly) has a conversation with Senator Bail Organa in which they discuss delivering the plans for the Death Star to a Jedi Knight who went into hiding after the fall of the Republic; it is implied that they are talking about Obi-Wan.

A standalone film centered on Obi-Wan was previously in pre-production before being cancelled in favor of the live-action series Obi-Wan Kenobi. While the project was voted as the most wanted anthology film in a poll by The Hollywood Reporter, it was instead developed as a limited streaming series following the box office disappointment of Solo: A Star Wars Story. The film was to be directed and co-written by Stephen Daldry. According to TMZ, the movie would take place a few years after Revenge of the Sith, featuring marauding Tusken Raiders and an evil warlord, who bring Obi-Wan out of hiding to protect Luke.

Television

Clone Wars (2003) and The Clone Wars (2008–2014; 2020)
Obi-Wan Kenobi is a main character in the animated micro-series Star Wars: Clone Wars and the CGI animated series Star Wars: The Clone Wars, voiced by James Arnold Taylor. In both series, Obi-Wan is a general in the Clone Wars, and he and Anakin (voiced in each series respectively by Mat Lucas and Matt Lanter) have many adventures fighting the Separatists. During this time Obi-Wan's diplomatic skills earn him the appellation "The Negotiator" due to his reputation of preventing and stopping battles without the use of weapons. The latter series highlights his numerous confrontations with General Grievous, his adversarial relationship with Dark Jedi Asajj Ventress (voiced by Nika Futterman), his romance with Duchess Satine Kryze (voiced by Anna Graves), and the return of his old enemy Darth Maul.

Rebels (2014–2018)
In Star Wars Rebels, set five years before A New Hope, Obi-Wan appears as a hologram in the pilot episode, "Spark of Rebellion". In the Season 3 episode "Visions and Voices", protagonist Ezra Bridger (voiced by Taylor Gray) discovers that Obi-Wan is alive on Tatooine; Obi-Wan's old nemesis Darth Maul finds him as well. In the episode "Twin Suns", Obi-Wan finds Ezra while he is lost in the desert while letting him know Maul was intending to use him. At that moment, Maul attacks them, and Obi-Wan ushers Ezra to retreat. Obi-Wan mortally wounds Maul during a final lightsaber duel; with his dying breath, Maul asks Obi-Wan if he is protecting the "Chosen One", and Obi-Wan replies that he is. After Maul's death, Obi-Wan is seen watching over Luke Skywalker from a distance.

In Rebels, Obi-Wan was voiced by Stephen Stanton, who replaced James Arnold Taylor. Rebels creator Dave Filoni, who worked with the character during the full duration of Star Wars: The Clone Wars, said he considered asking McGregor to reprise and voice the role. However, a voice recording of the late Alec Guinness as Obi-Wan Kenobi was used in a 2018 episode.

The Bad Batch (2021)
Obi-Wan appears in a non-speaking cameo in the premiere episode Aftermath of Star Wars: The Bad Batch. He is shown in the prologue rescuing Palpatine with Anakin.

Obi-Wan Kenobi (2022)

Ewan McGregor reprised his role as a Jedi master in Obi-Wan Kenobi, a live-action series for Disney+ set between the end of the prequel trilogy and the start of the original trilogy. It was officially announced on August 23, 2019 at the D23 Expo. McGregor expressed his relief at the project's announcement "because for four years, I've been having to lie to people about it", and stated that the series would consist of six one-hour episodes. Deborah Chow will direct the series and executive produce alongside Hossein Amini, who wrote the series. Other executive producers include McGregor, Kennedy, and Tracey Seaward. During Disney Investor Day 2020, it was announced that Hayden Christensen would return as Darth Vader in the series and that it would be set ten years after the events of Revenge of the Sith. In March 2021, it was announced that filming would begin in April, and that the cast would include Joel Edgerton, Bonnie Piesse, Kumail Nanjiani, Indira Varma, Rupert Friend, O'Shea Jackson Jr., Sung Kang, Simone Kessell and Benny Safdie. This series justified the reason Leia named her son after Ben Kenobi.

Tales of the Jedi (2022)
Obi-Wan appears in the episode "Practice Makes Perfect" of Tales of the Jedi. He is shown attending Ahsoka's training in the Jedi Temple.

Novels and comics
Obi-Wan Kenobi appears briefly in the novel Dark Disciple (2015), based on unfinished episodes from The Clone Wars. It fleshes out the friendship between him and Rogue Jedi Quinlan Vos.

In the novelization of The Last Jedi (2017) written by Jason Fry, Luke hears Obi-Wan's voice as he becomes one with the Force, telling him to "let go".

The five-issue Marvel Comics mini-series Obi-Wan and Anakin focuses on the title characters between The Phantom Menace and Attack of the Clones. In the 2015 Star Wars comic series, Luke Skywalker goes to Obi-Wan's abandoned house on Tatooine and finds his diary, from which stories of Obi-Wan's past are recounted.

Obi-Wan appears as a main character in the novel Master and Apprentice (2019) by Claudia Gray, set before the events of The Phantom Menace. The book details his relationship with his Jedi Master, Qui-Gon Jinn. He is also a main character in the novel Brotherhood (2022) by Mike Chen, set at the beginning of the Clone Wars. Obi-Wan is featured as the protagonist of the novel Star Wars Padawan (2022) by Kiersten White, in which the character's early years as an apprentice are explored.

Legends
Obi-Wan appears extensively in the Star Wars Expanded Universe of comic books and novels. In April 2014, all prior works except the episodic films and The Clone Wars animated series were rebranded by Lucasfilm as Legends and declared non-canon to the franchise.

Novels
Obi-Wan's life prior to The Phantom Menace is portrayed mostly in Jude Watson's Jedi Apprentice series, which follows his adventures as Qui-Gon's Padawan. Notable events in the series include battling the Dark Jedi Xanatos and going on his first independent mission. Watson's Jedi Quest series detail his adventures with Anakin in the years leading up to Attack of the Clones.

Obi-Wan's heroism just before and during the Clone Wars is portrayed in novels such as Outbound Flight, The Approaching Storm, and The Cestus Deception.

Obi-Wan's life between Revenge of the Sith and A New Hope is portrayed mostly in Jude Watson's The Last of the Jedi series. Set roughly a year after the fall of the Republic, the series follows Obi-Wan as he seeks out possible survivors of the Great Jedi Purge, most notably Anakin's former rival, Ferus Olin. The books also portray Obi-Wan adjusting to life as a hermit on Tatooine and quietly watching over Luke. He discovers that Vader is still alive after seeing him on the Holonet, the galaxy's official news source.

Obi-Wan appears in the final chapter of Dark Lord: The Rise of Darth Vader, set just after the events in Revenge of the Sith, in which he learns with alarm that Vader survived their duel on Mustafar. Qui-Gon reassures him that Vader would not step foot on Tatooine - out of fear of reawakening Anakin Skywalker. He advises Obi-Wan not to reveal to Luke his true parentage until the time is right.

Obi-Wan appears as a Force ghost in many novels set after Return of the Jedi. In The Truce at Bakura, he appears to Luke to warn him about the threat presented by the Ssi-ruuk; in The Lost City of the Jedi, he guides Luke to the eponymous city on Yavin IV; in Heir to the Empire, meanwhile, he bids farewell to Luke, explaining that he must abandon his spiritual form to "move on" to a new, higher plane of consciousness. Before parting, Luke says that Obi-Wan was like a father to him, and Obi-Wan replies that he loved Luke like a son.

Kenobi is a Star Wars Legends novel that tells the story of Obi-Wan Kenobi's first days of self-exile on the desert planet Tatooine following the events of Revenge of the Sith. It was written by John Jackson Miller and first published by Del Rey in hardcover on August 27, 2013. The first paperback edition was released on July 29, 2014, and includes the short tie-in story "Incognito" by Miller.

Video games
Obi-Wan Kenobi appears in several video games, including:

Comic books
Issue #24 of Marvel's 1977 Star Wars comic depicts Obi-Wan during the time of the Republic.

Various Dark Horse Comics works utilize Kenobi, including several set during the Clone Wars. In Star Wars: Republic (1998–2006), Obi-Wan fights the Separatists during the Clone Wars. Among other notable storylines, he is kidnapped and tortured by Asajj Ventress before being rescued by Anakin ("Hate & Fear"), and apprehends corrupted Jedi Master Quinlan Vos ("The Dreadnaughts of Rendili"). Throughout the series, he grows increasingly wary of Palpatine's designs on the Republic and his influence on Anakin.

In the non-canon story "Old Wounds", published in Star Wars: Visionaries (2005) and set a few years after the events of Revenge of the Sith, Obi-Wan confronts Darth Maul on Tatooine to protect Luke. The duel ends when Owen Lars shoots and kills Maul; he then warns Obi-Wan to stay away from his nephew. Through the Force, Obi-Wan reassures Luke that he will be there for him when needed.

Cultural impact
Mad magazine parodied the original film under the title Star Roars and included a character named 'Oldie Von Moldie', a grizzled 97-year-old whose lightsaber runs on an extension cord. The Shanghai nightclub shown in the beginning of Indiana Jones and the Temple of Doom is called "Club Obi Wan" (Lucas wrote both the Star Wars and Indiana Jones series). A real bar/club by this name existed in the Xihai district of Beijing, China but closed in the summer of 2010. The Super Mario Bros. Super Show! episode "Star Koopa" (a spoof of Star Wars) also had its own parody of Obi-Wan called 'Obi-Wan Toadi', and the live-action segment "Zenned Out Mario" featured a parody called "Obi-Wan Cannoli". The 1998 Pinky and the Brain episode "Star Warners" (which spoofed Star Wars) featured Slappy Squirrel portraying a parody of Obi-Wan as 'Slappy Wanna Nappy'. In the Family Guy episode "Blue Harvest", Obi-Wan Kenobi is parodied by the character Herbert. In the short film Thumb Wars, Obi-Wan is parodied as the character "Oobedoob Benubi". In the film, his full name is 'Oobedoob Scooby-Doobi Benubi, the silliest name in the galaxy.' In the 1977 Star Wars parody Hardware Wars, Obi-Wan is parodied by the character "Augie Ben Doggie".

Guinness received an Academy Award for Best Supporting Actor nomination for his portrayal of Obi-Wan Kenobi.

In the parody song "The Saga Begins", released approximately one month after the release of Star Wars: Episode I – The Phantom Menace, "Weird Al" Yankovic sings a humorous summary of the plot of that film from Obi-Wan's perspective, to the tune of the song "American Pie".

In 2003, the American Film Institute selected Obi-Wan Kenobi as the 37th greatest movie hero of all time. He was also listed as IGN third greatest Star Wars character, as well as one of UGO Networks' favorite heroes of all time.

In 2004, the Council of the Commune Lubicz in Poland passed a resolution giving the name "Obi-Wan Kenobi" to one of the streets in Grabowiec, a small village near Toruń. The street was named in 2005. The spelling of the street name, Obi-Wana Kenobiego is the genitive form of the noun in the Polish language: (the street) of Obi-Wan Kenobi.

The Guardian cartoonist Steve Bell portrayed Jeremy Corbyn, former leader of the British Labour Party, as Obi-Wan Kenobi.

Portraits of Ewan McGregor as Kenobi have been confused for being those of Jesus.

Relationships

Mentorship tree

References

Footnotes

Citations

Sources

 
 The New Essential Guide to Characters, revised edition, 2002. Daniel Wallace, Michael Sutfin, 
 Star Wars Episode I Who's Who: A Pocket Guide to Characters of the Phantom Menace, hardcover, 1999. Ryder Windham, 
 Star Wars: Power of Myth, 1st edition paperback, 2000. DK Publishing, 
 Star Wars: The Visual Dictionary, hardcover, 1998. David West Reynolds, 
 Star Wars: The Phantom Menace: The Visual Dictionary, hardcover, 1999. David West Reynolds, 
 Star Wars: Attack of the Clones: The Visual Dictionary, hardcover, 2002. David West Reynolds, 
 Star Wars: Revenge of the Sith: The Visual Dictionary, hardcover, 2005. James Luceno, 
 Revised Core Rulebook (Star Wars Roleplaying Game), 1st edition, 2002. Bill Slavicsek, Andy Collins, J.D. Wiker, Steve Sansweet, 
 Star Wars Roleplaying Game Core Rulebook, 1st edition, 2000. Bill Slavicsek, Andy Collins,

External links

Obi-Wan Kenobi on IMDb

Characters created by George Lucas
Fantasy television characters
Fictional ambassadors
Extraterrestrial superheroes
Film characters introduced in 1977
Fictional commanders
Fictional exiles
Fictional generals
Fictional genocide survivors
Fictional ghosts
Fictional hermits
Fictional martial arts trainers
Fictional military personnel in films
Fictional outlaws
Fictional space pilots
Fictional spiritual mediums
Fictional sole survivors
Fictional swordfighters in films
Fictional energy swordfighters
Fictional war veterans
Male characters in film
Male characters in television
Star Wars comics characters
Star Wars literary characters
Star Wars Jedi characters
Star Wars Skywalker Saga characters
Star Wars: The Clone Wars characters
Star Wars Rebels characters
Tales of the Jedi (TV series) characters
Star Wars video game characters